Panjak in Iran, may refer to:
 Panjak, Mazandaran
 Panjak, Sistan and Baluchestan